Rock 'n Roll Records was a subsidiary record label under Scotti Brothers Records (also known as Scotti Bros. Records), which was a California-based record label founded by Tony and Ben Scotti. The label is most noted for helping to launch the career of parodist "Weird Al" Yankovic. Other artists on the label included Felony and Hisao Shinagawa, among other novelty, rock, pop, and new wave bands and artists.

Rock n' Roll's catalogue now belong to Volcano Entertainment, a division of Sony Music.

See also
 List of record labels

External links

American record labels
Pop record labels
Rock record labels
Record labels established in 1981
Companies based in San Francisco
1981 establishments in California